"Walkin' My Baby Back Home" is a popular song written in 1930 by Roy Turk (lyrics) and Fred E. Ahlert (music).

The song first charted in 1931 with versions by Nick Lucas (No. 8), Ted Weems (also No. 8), The Charleston Chasers (No. 15) and Lee Morse (No. 18).

Other recordings
A recording made by Jo Stafford on November 9, 1945, was released by Capitol Records as catalog number 20049, and on her album, Songs by Jo Stafford (catalog number B-D23).
Harry Richman recorded the song on November 4, 1947. This version was released by Decca Records as catalog number 24391.
Maurice Chevalier recorded the song on February 22, 1931 for Victor Records in New York.
A major hit version of it was recorded by Nat King Cole at the Capitol Studios at 5515 Melrose Avenue in Hollywood, on September 4, 1951 and released by Capitol Records as catalog number 2130. It went to No. 8 in 1952. 
The song charted again in 1952 at No. 4 in a version recorded in February 1952 by Johnnie Ray, released by Columbia Records as catalog number 39750. Ray's version peaked at number 12 in the UK Singles Chart in November 1952. 
It was used as the title song for the 1953 film Walking My Baby Back Home, starring Donald O'Connor, Janet Leigh, Buddy Hackett, and Scatman Crothers. In the film, the song was performed by O'Connor.
In 1962, Monica Zetterlund with Georg Riedel's Orchestra recorded a version of this song with Swedish lyrics by Beppe Wolgers entitled Sakta vi gå genom stan (lit. "Slowly we walk through the city"). It is a subtle tribute to Stockholm, and has in recent years been voted the most popular song about the Swedish capital (in a poll by Radio Stockholm). Zetterlund has had a Stockholm park named after her. The song was released on the Philips label.
In 1967, Ronnie Dove covered the song for his album Cry.
In 2008, Natalie Cole recorded the song as a virtual duet with her father and it was the first single for her album Still Unforgettable, released on September 9, 2008.
Elvis Costello (with acoustic guitar) performed a version as an encore in his Auckland, New Zealand concert, January 19, 2013 and in Troy, New York on November 6, 2013.

Other notable recorded versions

John Allred
Paul Anka
Ray Anthony
Louis Armstrong
Hilde Lovise Asbjørnsen (No Vil Eg Vake Med Dig) Norwegian
Les Baxter Orchestra and Chorus
Tex Beneke and his Orchestra
George Benson
Ed Bickert
Page Cavanaugh
Chas & Dave
Chubby Checker & Bobby Rydell
Maurice Chevalier
Eri Chiemi
Freddy Cole
Nat King Cole Penthouse Serenade
Bing Crosby
Sammy Davis Jr. The Nat King Cole Songbook, (1965).
Craig Douglas
Cliff "Ukulele Ike" Edwards
Les Elgart and his Orchestra
Lionel Ferbos
Ella Fitzgerald
Tennessee Ernie Ford
The Four Freshmen
Judy Garland
Fei Ge
Stéphane Grappelli
Lionel Hampton
Annette Hanshaw
Coleman Hawkins
Dick Haymes
Woody Herman
Dan Hicks
Earl Hines
Art Hodes
Laurence James
Elliot Lawrence
Gisele MacKenzie
Dean Martin
Billy May and his Orchestra
Dave McKenna
Van Morrison
Ronald Muldrow
Willie Nelson
Joe Pass
Bob and Alf Pearson
Dave Pell Octet
Ray Pennington
Bent Persson
Oscar Peterson
John Pizzarelli
Bill Ramsey
Nelson Riddle and his Orchestra
Jimmy Roselli
Tommy Sands
Don Shirley
James Taylor
Livingston Taylor
Jerry Vale
Leroy Vinnegar Sextet
Washboard Rhythm Kings
Faron Young

Use in media
In the opening of the 2002 TV film Martin and Lewis, Dean Martin (played by Jeremy Northam) performs the song at the Riobamba Club in New York City.

References

Songs with music by Fred E. Ahlert
Songs with lyrics by Roy Turk
Nat King Cole songs
1930 songs
Johnnie Ray songs
Monica Zetterlund songs
Pop standards